Adícora is a village located northeast coast of the Paraguaná Peninsula, in Venezuela, specifically in the Falcón Municipality and 24 kilometers south of the island of Aruba.

Is accessible by road or air (by plane - to and from Adicora Airport - SVAR). It is a shallow beach, protected by reefs, fresh water, more swell than western. In the town of Adícora are several inns, like residences for rental accommodation and diversity of restaurants.

Etymology

Adícora means "Jajatal", halophytic grass of brackish land. This indigenous voice originally was "jadícuar", has been going through "jatícora" for "jadícora" for "aríkula" until today "Adícora".

Sports and culture

Adicora has constant wind and its conditions give the opportunity to locals and tourists to participate in wind-related sports like Kiteboarding and Windsurf. It constantly blows an average of 17 knots which is ideal for the sports practice. There are local schools taught by locals to tourists interested in learning. The sport has increased tourism and attendance in local inns, as well as investments in restaurants and sports academies.

There are other close beaches with great wind conditions for the Sports, like Matagorda. They offer better views and beautiful coasts, but the best wind is found in Adicora.

Climate
Climate, warm and tropical (28 °C - 34 °C), its shallow warm waters. Northern Beaches offer flat water; South beaches are, chop, sailing and surfing swell of 8–10 feet, its winds "side-onshore" of East - Northwest constant throughout the year, the strongest during the months of February to September (6Bft hard) and milder during the months of October to January (4Bft + hard). May is the windiest month.

Gallery

External links 

Populated places in Falcón
Beaches of Venezuela